Michalis Bousis (born 2 January 1999) is a Greek professional footballer who plays as a left-back for Super League 2 club Egaleo.

Career

AEK Athens
Bousis comes from AEK Athens' youth ranks.

On 25 August 2019, he was loaned to Ergotelis.

On 6 October 2020, he joined Apollon Larissa on a season-long loan.

References

External links
 

1999 births
Living people
Greece youth international footballers
Super League Greece players
Super League Greece 2 players
AEK Athens F.C. players
Ergotelis F.C. players
Association football defenders
Footballers from Athens
Greek footballers